Miriam Isabel Gallardo Tenemás (born 2 May 1968) is a retired volleyball player from Peru. She won the silver medal with the Women's National Team at the 1988 Summer Olympics in Seoul, South Korea. She also competed at the 1984 Summer Olympics in Los Angeles, California.

References

External links
 
 

1968 births
Living people
Olympic volleyball players of Peru
Volleyball players at the 1984 Summer Olympics
Volleyball players at the 1988 Summer Olympics
Olympic silver medalists for Peru
Place of birth missing (living people)
Peruvian women's volleyball players
Olympic medalists in volleyball
Medalists at the 1988 Summer Olympics
Pan American Games medalists in volleyball
Pan American Games silver medalists for Peru
Pan American Games bronze medalists for Peru
Volleyball players at the 1987 Pan American Games
Volleyball players at the 1991 Pan American Games
Medalists at the 1987 Pan American Games
Medalists at the 1991 Pan American Games
20th-century Peruvian women